A destruction layer is a stratum found in the excavation of an archaeological site showing evidence of the hiding and burial of valuables, the presence of widespread fire, mass murder, unburied corpses, loose weapons in public places, or other evidence of destruction, either by natural causes (for example earthquakes), or as a result of a military action.

Destruction layers are often found associated with a change in subsequent pottery styles or material culture artefacts, indicating an invasion by a foreign people or intrusive element. Finding such destruction layers in a number of related sites may indicate a collapse of a state, especially if associated with an appearance of a markedly different culture in upper horizons.

Archaeological sites with destruction layers
The city of Troy shows two famous destruction layers, Level 2 (dated approximately 2200 BCE) and Level 7 (dated approximately 1200 BCE, and linked with the Trojan War). The destruction layers associated with Knossos in Crete was for a long time associated with the invasion of Archaeans led by Thesius, until it was proven by Michael Ventris that the Linear B syllabary was a form of early Greek language. The destruction of the cities of the Mycenaean Greece were for a long time associated with arrival of the Dorians, before closer excavation showed that these destructions were not contemporaneous, and in fact pre-dated the so-called "Dorian invasions" by a century or more. The volcanic explosion of Thera shows a destruction layer at the town of Akrotiri thought by some to have been the origins of the story of Atlantis.  The cities of the Indus Valley civilization, Mohenjo Daro and Harrappa show destruction layers associated with their subsequent abandonment, and for a long time this was attributed to Indo-Aryan invaders. The Hittite city of Hattusa and many sites of the Levant show a destruction layer at the end of the Bronze Age, as a part of the Bronze Age collapse, after which the sites were abandoned. Destruction layers form an important part of the study of Biblical archaeology.

References

Archaeological terminology
Disasters